The Cyprus national handball team is the national handball team of Cyprus and is controlled by the Cyprus Handball Federation.

IHF Emerging Nations Championship record
2017 – 4th place
2023 – Qualified

External links
Official website
IHF profile

Men's national handball teams
Handball